Anthony A. Okanlawon (born March 4, 1979) is a former American football defensive back who played one game in the National Football League (NFL) for the San Diego Chargers. He played college football at Maryland.

Early life and education
Okanlawon was born on March 4, 1979, in Lagos, Nigeria, and grew up in Maryland. He was the second-oldest of seven children. He attended DeMatha Catholic High School and graduated in 1998, having been named first-team all-conference and honorable mention USA Today All-American as a senior.

Okanlawon committed to the University of Maryland and saw immediate playing time as a true freshman, making six starts and 39 tackles. As a sophomore in 1999, he started three games and played in a total of nine, missing several games due to a pulled hamstring. Okanlawon made 26 solo tackles and 31 total, while also recording three passes defended and a fumble recovery.

In the season finale of the 1999, Okanlawon allowed Billy McMullen to score the game-winning touchdown in the final minute, which ended any hope of Maryland making the bowl game. He used the play as motivation for the 2000 season and was named Maryland's most improved player in spring drills. He started eleven games in as a junior, making 40 tackles and his first career interception (against Virginia).

As a senior, Okanlawon started the season with an interception in each of the first two games and by the end of week five had the national lead in interceptions. Okanlawon missed four games due to a "medical issue" which coach Ralph Friedgen said he "was not at liberty to discuss." He returned for the final game of the season, starting in a loss in the Orange Bowl to Florida.

Despite missing four games, Okanlawon was named first-team All-Atlantic Coast Conference (ACC) at the end of the year. He finished the season with five interceptions and ten passes defended. He finished his college career with 38 games played, 141 total tackles and six interceptions.

Professional career
After going unselected in the 2002 NFL Draft, Okanlawon was signed by the San Diego Chargers as an undrafted free agent. In a preseason game against the Seattle Seahawks, he returned an interception 55 yards for a touchdown to help the Chargers win 24–14. He made the final roster but was inactive for the first two games, and was placed on injured reserve prior to week three, ending his season.

After an injury to safety Kwamie Lassiter, he was re-signed on November 20. He was inactive for each game before making his NFL debut in the 24–40 loss to the Pittsburgh Steelers on December 21. It was the only professional game in his career.

Okanlawon was waived by the Chargers on June 17, .

On January 7, Okanlawon was signed by the Philadelphia Soul of the Arena Football League (AFL). He was waived on January 20, without appearing in a game.

References

1979 births
Living people
Nigerian players of American football
American football defensive backs
Maryland Terrapins football players
Sportspeople from Lagos
San Diego Chargers players
Philadelphia Soul players